Thoralf Pryser (10 August 1885 – 8 July 1970) was a Norwegian journalist and newspaper editor.

Personal life 
Pryser was born in Drammen, a son of Gustav Fredrik Pryser and Caroline Johanne Grimlund. He married Laila Meyer in 1912. His wife died in 1944. In 1951 he married Elisabeth Lie. He died in July 1970.

Career 
Pryser worked as journalist for Verdens Gang from 1910, for Morgenbladet from 1911, and for Aftenposten from 1913. He was chief editor of the newspaper Morgenposten from 1918 to 1946, except for 1943-1945 when Morgenposten had installed a Nazi editor. He chaired the Norwegian Press Association from 1924 to 1928.

He was decorated Commander of the Order of the Three Stars, Commander of the Order of the Lithuanian Grand Duke Gediminas, Officer of the Order of the White Lion, Knight of the Order of Dannebrog, and received the Order of Merit of the Republic of Hungary.

References

1885 births
1970 deaths
People from Drammen
Norwegian newspaper editors
Commander's Crosses of the Order of the Lithuanian Grand Duke Gediminas
Officers of the Order of the White Lion
Knights of the Order of the Dannebrog
Recipients of the Order of Merit of the Republic of Hungary